Kim Jin-hyun is a South Korean professional footballer who plays as a midfielder for K League 1 side Pohang Steelers.

Club career
After going through the Pohang Steelers youth academy, Kim joined the newly promoted K League 1 side Gwangju FC on loan for a season. He made his professional debut for the club on 9 May 2020 against Seongnam FC in which he started and played just 37 minutes before being substituted.

Career statistics

Club

References

External links
 

1999 births
Living people
South Korean footballers
South Korea under-20 international footballers
Association football midfielders
Pohang Steelers players
Gwangju FC players
K League 1 players